Mihai Savu (1894 – 1968) was a Romanian fencer. He competed in three events at the 1928 Summer Olympics.

References

1894 births
1968 deaths
Romanian male fencers
Romanian épée fencers
Romanian foil fencers
Olympic fencers of Romania
Fencers at the 1928 Summer Olympics
Sportspeople from Bucharest